Hypsiglena affinis is a species of snake in the family Colubridae.  The species is native to Mexico.

References

Hypsiglena
Reptiles of Mexico
Endemic fauna of Mexico
Taxa named by George Albert Boulenger
Reptiles described in 1894